The Jardin botanique de la Bastide (4 hectares) is the new municipal botanical garden located on the right bank of the Garonne, along the Allée Jean Giono in Bordeaux, Gironde, Aquitaine, France.

It is open daily without charge. This garden is an offshoot of the older Jardin botanique de Bordeaux, located across the river.

The garden opened in 2003 and is organized into six sections, including an arboretum, fields of grain, an alley of vines, and a water garden (1,250 m²). It also contains greenhouses, as well as eleven landscapes representing the environments of Aquitaine, including dune, cliff, wet grassland, moorland, etc.

Gallery

See also 
 Jardin botanique de Bordeaux
 List of botanical gardens in France

References 
 Jardin botanique de Bordeaux
 BGCI entry
 1001 Fleurs entry (French)
 Je Decouvre La France entry (French)
 Philippe Prévost and Richard Zéboulon, Les plus beaux jardins du sud-ouest, éditions sud-ouest, 

Bordeaux
Bastide, Jardin botanique de
Bastide, Jardin botanique de
Tourist attractions in Bordeaux